The Leechburg Bridge is a bridge that crosses the Kiskiminetas River
between West Leechburg and Leechburg in Pennsylvania U.S.A. It carries unsigned state route 4093 and connects with Pennsylvania Route 66 just after the Leechburg approach.

This five-span 1935 truss bridge replaced an older structure on the site. It features unusually wide shoulders, due to the presence of turning lanes immediately at the ends of the bridge. In 1984, the bridge was rehabilitated.

See also

 List of crossings of the Kiskiminetas River

References

Historic Bridges
Bridge Mapper

Bridges in Armstrong County, Pennsylvania
Bridges in Westmoreland County, Pennsylvania
Bridges completed in 1935
Road bridges in Pennsylvania
Bridges over the Kiskiminetas River